Robert Hunt (born 16 August 1996) is a South African rugby union player for the  in the United Rugby Championship and for the  in the Currie Cup. His regular position is tighthead prop.

Hunt was named in the  squad for the 2021–22 United Rugby Championship. He made his debut in Round 3 of the 2021–22 United Rugby Championship against .

Honours
 United Rugby Championship runner-up 2021-22

References

South African rugby union players
Living people
1996 births
Rugby union props
Leopards (rugby union) players
Bulls (rugby union) players
Blue Bulls players
Rugby union players from the Western Cape